The Brand New Monty Python Bok was the second book to be published by the British comedy troupe Monty Python. Edited by Eric Idle, it was published by Methuen Books in 1973 and contained more print-style comic pieces than their first effort, Monty Python's Big Red Book.

The white dust jacket was printed with some realistic looking smudged fingerprints on the front, leading to several complaints and returned copies from booksellers. These complaints paled in comparison to the fuss created about the cover printed on the actual book. The title of the fake cover was Tits 'n Bums, appearing as a pornographic magazine with a background photo of several intertwined naked women, but purporting to be a church magazine with articles such as "Are you still a verger?", and  a 'weekly look at church architecture'. As Michael Palin remembered: "Our publisher Geoffrey Strachan told the story of an elderly lady bookseller from Newbury who refused to believe the fingerprints were put there deliberately. 'In that case I shall sell the books without their jackets', she said and slammed the phone down so quickly that Geoffrey was unable to warn her that beneath each dust-cover was a mock soft-core magazine".

The book contained an amalgamation of print-style pieces and material derived from Flying Circus sketches.  Examples of the former include an interconnected series of jokes based on figures of speech and an advertisement for the fictional Welsh martial art of Llap Goch, which claims to be able to teach students how to grow taller, stronger, faster, and more deadly in a matter of days.  Examples of the latter include Sam Peckinpah's "Salad Days" and the Travel Agent sketch, a collection of stereotypes about annoying tourists and the perils of inter-country air travel.

In 1974 a paperback edition was issued as The Brand New Monty Python Papperbok, containing the same contents minus the Tits 'n Bums book cover. In 1981 both this book and Monty Python's Big Red Book were reissued as a hardback book entitled The Complete Works Of Shakespeare And Monty Python: Volume One - Monty Python. Paperback editions of both these books were reissued again in 1986 as The Monty Python Gift Boks, sold together inside an outer cover which folded out into a mini poster.

Contents

Covers
Tits 'n Bums: A Weekly Look at Church Architecture (Front cover, under dust jacket)
What People Have Said About The Brand New Monty Python Bok (Inside front flap)
What Other People Have Said About The Brand New Monty Python Bok (Inside front flap)

Inside

Ferdean School Library Check-out History
Safety Instructions
The Old Story Teller
Biggles
Page 6: Film Rights Still Available
Llap-Goch Advertisement
Edward Woodward's Fish Page
The Python Book of Etiquette
Famous First Drafts
Advertisements / My Garden Poem
A Puzzle
The Bigot Newsletter
The London Casebook of Detective René Descartes
Wallpapers
16 Magazine
Summer Madness
Masturbation: The Difficult One
Coming Soon: Page 71!
Python Panel
The Adventures of Walter the Wallabee
Mr. April (I've Got Two Legs)
Competition Time
World Record Attempt
World Record Results / Invitations
The Oxfod Simplified Dictionary
Drawing Hands
Film Review: Sam Peckinpah's "Salad Days"
Rat Recipes
Rat Menu
Overland to the World
This Page is in Colour
Contents
African Notebook: "A Lucky Escape"
How To...
Only 15 Pages to Page 71
Norman Henderson's Diary (Insert)
Sex-Craft (Insert)
How to Take Your Appendix Out on the Piccadilly Line
Join the Dots
Directory
The British Apathy League
Let's Talk About Bottoms
Advertisements / Hobbies
Page 71
Reviews of Page 71
Through the Looking Glass
The Hackenthorpe Book of Lies
Fairy Tale
Ferndean School Report
The Stratton Indicator
Play Cheese Shop
The Official Medallic Commemoration of the History of Mankind
Anagrams
Your Stars
Hamsters: A Warning
Teach Yourself Surgery
The Author's Friend by Michael Palin, Age 8 (Back Inside Flap)

Credits
 Authors - Graham Chapman, John Cleese, Terry Gilliam, Eric Idle, Terry Jones, Michael Palin
 Additional material - Connie Booth
 Illustrator - Terry Gilliam
 Additional illustration - Peter Brookes
 Editor - Eric Idle
 Design/Graphics - Kate Hepburn, Lucinda Cowell
 Photography - Roger Perry, Roger Last, Reinholdt Binder
 Additional photography - Camera Press, Hulton Picture Library, Barnaby Picture Library, The Mansell Collection, Graphic House Inc.

References

Monty Python literature
Methuen Publishing books
1973 books